Intelligence Committee may refer to:
 European Coordinating Committee for Artificial Intelligence
 Intelligence Community Coordination Committee (Croatia)
 Intelligence and Security Committee of Parliament (UK)
 Joint Intelligence Committee (India), see National Security Council (India)
 Joint Intelligence Committee (UK)
 National Intelligence Co-ordinating Committee (South Africa)
 Parliamentary Joint Committee on Intelligence and Security (Australia)
 Security Intelligence Review Committee (Canada)
 United States House Permanent Select Committee on Intelligence
 United States Senate Select Committee on Intelligence